эthelmaer (or эthelmэr) was a medieval Bishop of Elmham.

Life
Æthelmaer was the brother of Stigand, Archbishop of Canterbury. He was consecrated in 1047 and deprived of office circa 11 April 1070 by Ermenfrid, bishop of Sion, who was the papal legate to England.

References

External links
 

Bishops of Elmham